Giovanni Lapentti and Fernando Romboli won the first edition of this tournament, defeating 6–2, 6–1 André Ghem and Rodrigo Guidolin in the final.

Seeds

Draw

Draw

External links
 Main Draw

Pernambuco Brasil Open Series - Doubles